Bogdan A. Dobrescu is a Romanian-born theoretical physicist with interests in high-energy physics associated with Fermilab. Previously he was a postdoctoral researcher at Yale University. He completed his Ph.D. in 1997 at Boston University.

In 2013, Dobrescu was elected a Fellow of the American Physical Society.

Selected works

References

External links
  Bogdan A. Dobrescu's papers in the INSPIRE Database

Year of birth missing (living people)
Boston University alumni
Theoretical physicists
Particle physicists
People associated with Fermilab
Living people
Fellows of the American Physical Society